The Filipino Academy of Movie Arts and Sciences awards the  Natatanging Alagad ng Sining to honor the achievements of the King of Philippine Movies, Fernando Poe, Jr., who died just six months prior to the awards.

Background of Recipient 
Fernando Poe, Jr. is one of the most popular movie stars in Philippine Cinema. His extraordinary following and charisma onscreen has garnered him the highest title anyone can bestow on  an individual in Philippine Cinema. His signature roles as defender of the masses in many action films has cemented his reputation and has gained him a large following. In addition to his exemplary career as an actor, Poe has also dabbled in writing and directing. In fact, Poe has won a FAMAS for Writing: Story in 1970 and two for Directing in 1984 and 1995, which are a testament to his artistic inclinations in film.

Recipient of the Natatanging Alagad ng Sining Award 
 2004 (53rd) Fernando Poe, Jr.

Natatanging Alagad ng Sining Award